Brett Hungerford (born 2 April 1969) is a former Australian rules footballer who played for Geelong in the Australian Football League (AFL) in 1990. He was recruited from the Tooleybuc Football Club in the Mid Murray Football League.

References

External links

Living people
1969 births
Geelong Football Club players
Australian rules footballers from New South Wales